François de Blanchefort de Créquy, later Marquis de Marines, 2 October 1629 to 3 February 1687, was a 17th-century French noble and soldier, who served in the wars of Louis XIV of France.

He came from a powerful and well-connected family, his grandfather Charles I de Blanchefort (1578–1638) being a Marshal of France. Rewarded for supporting the Royalists during the 1648-1653 civil war, his elder brother Charles (1623-1687) was a senior advisor to Louis while François had a successful military career.

Promoted Marshall in 1668, like other French soldiers of his generation he was over shadowed by Condé and Turenne. He fell from favour in April 1672 and although subsequently reinstated failed to regain his former prestige. He retired from service in 1684 and died in Paris in 1687.

Life

François de Blanchefort de Créquy was born in Poix-de-Picardie on 2 October 1629, youngest of three sons of Charles de Blanchefort (ca 1598-1630) and Anne Grimoard du Roure (ca 1601-1686). The family originated in Créquy, Artois, part of the Spanish Netherlands until annexed by France in 1659; branches were distributed throughout Northern France, including Bernieulles, Auffay and Heilly, while 'de Créquis' served in the armies of the Dutch Republic and Sweden. 

His grandfather, Charles I de Blanchefort (1578–1638), was a trusted advisor to Louis XIII and a Marshal of France, who commanded French troops at the 1636 victory of Tornavento; his father died at the siege of Chambéry in 1630.  

His eldest brother Charles (1623-1687) was one of Louis XIV's closest counsellors, whose wife served as chief Lady-in-waiting to Queen Maria Theresa of Spain. Their middle brother Alphonse (1628-1711) inherited the title of duc de Lesdiguières in 1703 but in general had a less distinguished career than his siblings.

In 1657, de Créquy married Catherine de Rougé (1641-1713); they had two children, François Joseph (1662–1702), killed at Luzzara, and Nicolas Charles (1669-1696) who died of disease at Tournai. He became the Marquis de Marines after purchasing the lordship of Marines, Val-d'Oise in 1659.

Career
The first half of the 17th century in France was a period of intense internal and external conflict. A series of Huguenot rebellions broke out in the 1620s, while French support for the Dutch rebellion against Habsburg Spain led to the Franco-Spanish War (1635–1659). The internal tensions that resulted culminated in 1648 with the Fronde, a  struggle for control between regional magnates like Condé, and a Court party headed by Anne of Austria, mother of the 8 year old Louis XIV, and Cardinal Mazarin. It was largely suppressed by 1652, but the war with Spain continued.

Like his elder brother, de Créquy supported the Royalists during the Fronde and by 1658 he was a Lieutenant-General. He commanded the French right under Turenne at The Dunes in June, a decisive victory that led to the 1659 Treaty of the Pyrenees. Shortly afterwards, de Créquy purchased the Chateau of Marines, adding formal gardens by André Le Nôtre, the leading landscape designer of the period; it remained in the family until 1714 and was painted by Paul Cézanne in 1890.

In September 1667 during the War of Devolution, a French army captured the strategic town of Lille; the Spanish relief force arrived too late and Turenne detached cavalry under Bellefonds and de Créquy to cut off their retreat. Supported by Humières, they inflicted nearly 2,000 casualties and in the excitement of victory, Louis impulsively promoted all three Marshal of France. Despite capturing large areas of the Spanish Netherlands, a Dutch-led coalition forced France to return most of their gains in the Treaty of Aix-la-Chapelle (1668) and Louis began plans to attack the Republic directly. 

As part of this process, de Créquy commanded an army that occupied the strategic Duchy of Lorraine in August 1670. By early 1672, French preparations were complete but the problems caused by Louis' promotions now became apparent. Since Marshals were subordinate only to the king, they could not serve under another and as their numbers were always greater than the positions available, it led to bitter arguments over status. When Turenne was appointed commander of the invasion force in April 1672, Bellefonds, Humières and de Créquy refused to serve under him; all three were sentenced to internal exile and de Créquy retired to Marines. 

The Franco-Dutch War began in May and the French initially seemed to have achieved an overwhelming victory. However, by late July the Dutch had stabilised their position, with support from Emperor Leopold and Charles II of Spain opening new fronts in Spain and the Rhineland. With the expansion of the war, de Créquy returned to service in 1673 but an attempt to relieve Trier was defeated at Konzer Brücke in August 1675. Despite fighting his way through enemy lines to reach the town and organise the defence, in September the unpaid and starving garrison mutinied and forced him to surrender. A relatively minor setback, this defeat clearly rankled and was specifically mentioned in the eulogy delivered at Louis' funeral in 1715. 

Although it damaged his standing, the death of Turenne at Salzbach in July 1675 and Condé's retirement meant de Créquy was given a new command in early 1678. With negotiations near completion at Nijmegen, Louis planned a short campaign to strengthen his position in the Spanish Netherlands and remaining on the defensive elsewhere. De Créquy was instructed to avoid battle and ensure the retention of Freiburg, which he had taken by surprise in November 1677 and was now threatened by an Imperial army of 30,000 under Charles V, Duke of Lorraine. He won two quick victories over Charles at Rheinfelden and Ortenbach, forcing him back into the Electoral Palatinate, then captured Kehl and its bridge over the Rhine.

This success partially restored his reputation and in 1681 he supervised the siege of the Fortress of Luxembourg, withdrawing after France annexed Strasbourg before capturing it during the War of the Reunions in 1684. This was his final military action; he died in Paris on 3 February 1687, ten days before his brother Charles on 13th. De Créquy and his wife were buried in the church attached to the convent of Saint-Honoré in Paris, demolished in 1816. Their memorial was designed by Charles Le Brun and executed by Antoine Coysevox; when the Jacobin club took over the church during the French Revolution, this was moved to the Church of Saint-Roch, where it can be seen today.

De Créquy is referenced by the English playwright John Dryden in his 1678 work Mr. Limberman or the Kind Keeper.

References

Sources
 
 ;
 ;
 ;
 ;
 ;
 ;
 
 
 
 ;

Francois de Crequy
Marshals of France
French knights
1629 births
1687 deaths
Burials at Saint-Roch, Paris
17th-century French people
Order of the Holy Spirit
French military personnel of the Franco-Dutch War
Military personnel of the Franco-Spanish War (1635–1659)